Nanjing Fuzimiao or Fuzimiao,  is a Confucius Temple and former site of imperial examination hall located in southern Nanjing City on banks of the Qinhuai River. It is now a popular tourist attraction with pedestrian shopping streets around the restored temple buildings.

Nanjing Confucius Temple is located in Qinhuai District, Nanjing City, on the north bank of the Qinhuai River Gongyuan Street, Jiangnan Gongyuan west, located in the Confucius temple Qinhuai scenery belt core area, namely Nanjing Confucius Temple, Nanjing Confucian Temple, Wenxuanwang Temple, for the place of worship and sacrifice of Confucius, It is the first national highest institution of learning in China, one of the four major temples of literature in China, the hub of ancient Chinese culture, the place where Nanking history and humanities gather and is not only the cultural and educational centre of Nanjing in the Ming and Qing dynasties but also the cultural and educational architectural complex that ranks first in the southeastern provinces.

History 
In first year of Jianwu reign of Jin Dynasty (CE 317), Nanking Imperial University was founded, initially on northern bank of Qinhuai River, and in the third year of Xiankang (CE 337) the campus extended to southern bank. Temple of Confucius was firstly constructed in the national school in the ninth year of Taiyuan (CE 384). The place was later destroyed. It was destroyed by fire during the Jianyan years of the Southern Song Dynasty.  In the first year of Jingyou during Song Dynasty (CE 1034), Confucius Temple was newly constructed on former site of imperial university, and was called Fuzimiao area along with Nanking Fuxue. The place became Imperial University again in 1365 in the early year of Ming Dynasty, and sixteen years later recovered to be the campus of Fuxue. During Qing Dynasty, there were two Xianxue (county schools of Shangyuan and Jiangning) in Fuzimiao area. In the end of Qing a primary school jointly sponsored by counties of Nanjing (Jiangning Fu) was established there. The current buildings date from the 19th century, in Qing Dynasty, with additions made since then. The temple lost all financial support by the state as a result of the revolution of 1911. During the late 1920s to 1931 and again in 1932 it was used as army barracks for troops the KMT regime and left in a dilapidated state. Some halls were used as picture gallery. In 1985 Fuzimiao area was restored.

There is Jiangnan Gongyuan near Fuzimiao Temple. It's the largest imperial examination hall in Ming and Qing dynasties.

Throughout its history, the temple along with the around area has been a place for study of Confucianism. There is a small exhibit of folkart within the temple.

It was a place to worship and consecrate Confucius, the great philosopher and educator of ancient China.

Tourism 
Nanjing Fuzimiao was officially approved as the first 5A open-style scenic spot of China in 2010 and also obtained high reputation and influence in tourism for home and abroad. The temple can be visited throughout the year. However, in the summer, temple is usually more crowded with tourists. Although the winter months are particularly cold, people can attend a notable festival during the first month of the lunar year  called Qinhuai Lantern Fair.

Cruise 
Qinhuai River flows through Fuzimiao. Visitors can take painted boats to cruise on the Qinhuai River. There are 50 to 60 original village sites that have been found on the banks. Other attractions include historical sites, gardens, painted boats, streets and folk customs. Boats can be taken at different wharfs along the river (there is Panchi Wharf, located in front of Dacheng Hall of Confucius Temple, Wuding Gate Wharf, Wharf of Kuixing Ge, and Stone City Wharf). Chinese traditional music is performed on the boats.

Directions 
Take Nanjing Metro Line 1 to Sanshanjie Station. Use Exit 3, turn right onto Shengzhou Road. Cross the next big street, continue on Jiankang Road. Walk past the traditional gate to the small square with the park, turn right onto the pedestrian shopping street (look for the signs of the famous coffee and ice cream chain stores). Walk all the way to the end of that street. The temple is on the large square opposite the wall with the yellow dragon.

Gallery

References

Buildings and structures in Nanjing
Confucian temples in China
Religious buildings and structures in Nanjing
19th-century Confucian temples